Leckie is a surname. Notable people with the surname include:

 Ann Leckie
 Bill Leckie
 Campbell Leckie
 Carolyn Leckie
 Charles Leckie, Scottish footballer
 David Leckie
 James Leckie, Australian rugby union referee
 Jim Leckie, New Zealand athlete
 John Leckie
 John Leckie (Australian politician)
 John Leckie (footballer), Scottish footballer
 Mathew Leckie, Australian footballer
 Robert Leckie (author)
 Robert Leckie (aviator)
 Robert Leckie (footballer)
 Robert Gilmour Leckie, Canadian mining engineer
 Ross Leckie (Scottish writer)
 Stephen Leckie, Scottish businessman
 Trevan Leckie (aviator/basketballer)

See also
 Leckie Range (disambiguation)
 Lecky